Cinema Extreme was a major UK short film funding awards scheme, created in 2002. The scheme was funded by the UK Film Council’s New Cinema Fund and Film4 and managed by The Bureau with the aim "to  seek out and develop filmmakers with a distinctive directorial voice and cinematic flair".  The fund was awarded on an annual basis, offering funding to a slate of around four short films.

Nineteen films were commissioned. They have been shown at festivals around the  world and won numerous awards including Best Short at the Edinburgh International Film Festival  for Duane Hopkins’ Love Me or Leave Me Alone and the Oscar for Best Short Film for Andrea Arnold’s Wasp.

The scheme has catapulted many of the commissioned filmmakers to their first  feature:

 Wasp director Andrea Arnold went on to direct Red Road which won the Cannes Jury Prize in 2006;
 A Changed Man director Jens Jonsson went on to direct God Morgon Alla Barn;
 Love Me or Leave Me Alone director Duane Hopkins and producer Samm Haillay are in  post-production on Better Things;
 The Bypass producer Trevor Ingman is producing feature documentary The Meerkats;
 Get the Picture director Rupert Wyatt and producer Adrian Sturges are in post-production  on The Escapist;
 Soft director Simon Ellis and producer Jane Hooks are in post production on Dogging: A Love Story;
 Dog's Mercury director Martin Raddich and producer Jane Hooks are in production on Crack Willow.

2010

2006

2004/2005

2003

Film organisations in the United Kingdom